"We Got Love" is a song written by Bernie Lowe and Kal Mann. It was first released as a single by Bobby Rydell in 1959. The song became a hit, spending 17 weeks on the Billboard Hot 100, peaking at No. 6, while reaching No. 4 on the Cash Box Top 100, and No. 5 on Canada's CHUM Hit Parade.

Other versions
A cover version by Alma Cogan was released in late 1959, and reached No. 26 on the UK's New Musical Express chart.
A French-language version, titled "Je Compte Sur Toi", was issued by Petula Clark in 1960, and reached No. 36 in Wallonia. 
The song was also covered by Tom Jones in 2009 at a Vincent Moon Take-Away Show video session.
A Swedish-language version, "Jag är kär" (I'm in love) by Britt Damberg was released in 1960 (Decca SDE 7209).

References

1959 singles
Bobby Rydell songs
Songs written by Bernie Lowe
Songs with lyrics by Kal Mann
1959 songs
Cameo Records singles